is a Shinto shrine in the Ichinomiya neighborhood of the city of Suzuka in Mie Prefecture, Japan. It is one of the two shrines which claim the title of ichinomiya of former Ise Province. The main festival of the shrine is held annually on October 10.

Enshrined kami
The kami enshrined at Tsubaki Jinja is:
 , leader of the kunitsukami and patron of martial arts such as aikido.

The kami enshrined at Nakato Jinja are:
 , ancestor of the Nakato clan
 , one of the Sumiyoshi sanjin

History
The origins of Tsubaki Jinja are unknown. Although there is no documentary evidence, the shrine's legend states that it was founded during the reign of the semi-legendary Emperor Yūryaku (reigned 456 to 479). Both shrines first appear in historical documentation in the Engishiki records from the early Heian period, and are classed as "minor shrines". Kūkai is alleged to have visited the shrine, and to have donated two masks for the lion dance. It is uncertain also when it began to be regarded as the ichinomiya of the province, although this is contested by Tsubaki Grand Shrine, (also in Suzuka); however by 1079 it had advanced to the highest court ranking, and was made a shrine for prayers to the impesrialfamily by Emperor Go-Shirakawa. However, the shrine was razed by Oda Nobunaga during his conquest of Ise Province and all old records were lost. The shrine was revived by the Hitotsuyanagi clan, daimyō of Kanbe Domain during the early Edo Period.

During the Meiji period era of State Shinto, the shrine was rated as a Prefectural shrine in 1871 under the Modern system of ranked Shinto Shrines.

Gallery

See also
List of Shinto shrines
Ichinomiya

References
 Plutschow, Herbe. Matsuri: The Festivals of Japan. RoutledgeCurzon (1996) 
 Ponsonby-Fane, Richard Arthur Brabazon. (1959).  The Imperial House of Japan. Kyoto: Ponsonby Memorial Society. OCLC 194887

External links

Notes

Shinto shrines in Mie Prefecture
Ise Province
Suzuka, Mie
Ichinomiya